Old Quay Bridge is a Grade II listed swing bridge in Runcorn, England.

History
Old Quay Bridge is a swing bridge across the Manchester Ship Canal between Runcorn and Wigg Island, built circa 1894. It took its name from the Old Quay Canal, a now defunct canal which is more commonly known as the Runcorn to Latchford Canal.

Usage

The bridge is still in use and is opened for traffic along the canal. The swing mechanism is operated from a control room on the Runcorn side of the bridge.

References

External links
 

Swing bridges in England
Bridges completed in 1894